Jacob Judah Leon Templo (1603 – after 1675) was a Jewish Dutch scholar, translator of the Psalms, and expert on heraldry, of Sephardic descent.

Biography
Jaco Judah Leon was the son of Portuguese-born Jews Abraham de Leão and Felipa de Fonseca. He became ḥakam in Middelburg and, after 1643, in Amsterdam, where he was engaged also as teacher in the Talmud Torah. He vocalized the entire Mishnah which was printed in 1646 at the establishment of Manasseh ben Israel, with the anonymous collaboration of Adam Boreel.

Jacob caused a great stir by a plan, drawn by him, of Solomon's Temple. It was exhibited before Charles II of England. The author published a short, comprehensive description in Spanish entitled Retrato del Templo de Selomoh. (Middelburg, 1642). This was translated into Dutch in the same year; into French in 1643; and by himself into Hebrew in 1650, with the title Tabnit Hekal. Duke August of Brunswick, and more particularly his wife Elizabeth, wished a German translation of this description and entrusted the task to Johann Saubert of Helmstädt. Someone else published such a translation in 1665, and Saubert therefore wrote a Latin translation in that year. An English version appeared in 1778, done by Moses Pereira de Castro, his great grand son, the son of Isaac Pereira de Castro and Lea DeLeon, the daughter of his son Abraham, and in whose possession the plan was then held.

In 1647 Jacob wrote Tratado de la Arca del Testamento (Amsterdam, 1653). His treatise on the cherubim, their form and nature, written in Latin in 1647, appeared in Spanish under the title Tratado de los Cherubim (Amsterdam, 1654); and his description of Moses' tabernacle, written in 1647 in Dutch, was published under the title Retrato del Tabernaculo de Moseh (Amsterdam, 1654), and in English (1675). His last work was a Spanish paraphrase of the Psalms, which was printed with the text, under the title Las Alabanças de Santitad (Amsterdam, 1671), and, as is stated in the introduction, was written in seven months. The work was dedicated to Isaac Senior Teixéyra, financial agent, in Hamburg, of Queen Christina of Sweden, and was praised by many ḥakamim, scholars, and poets in Hebrew, Latin, and Spanish verses.

Jacob wrote also a dialogue (Colloquium Middelburgense) between a rabbi and a Christian scholar on the value of the Christian dogmas; and he left in manuscript Disputaciones con Diferentes Theologos de la Cristiandad.

He was a skilful draftsman. The coat of arms of the Antient Grand Lodge of England with the motto, now "Holiness to the Lord," is the work of Judah Leon accord to Laurence Dermott, the first Grand Secretary, who in his book Ahiman Rezon attributes it to the "famous and learned Hebrewist, architect, and brother, Rabi Jacob Jehudah Leon." A version of this still exists as the arms of the United Grand Lodge of England and the Grand Lodge of Ireland. Although referred to as a "brother" in the text, Judah preceded the popular rise of freemasonry in England and is not known to have been personally initiated into a lodge. Judah also drew more than 200 figures and vignettes to illustrate Talmudical subjects, which his son Solomon gave to Surenhusius for his Latin translation of the Mishnah.

See also
 Collegiants

References

Giovanni Bernardo De Rossi-C. H. Hamberger, Hist. Wörterb. pp. 176 et seq.;
Koenen, Geschiedenis der Joden in Nederland, p. 337;
Jost, Gesch. des Judenthums und Seiner Sekten, iii. 233;
Heinrich Grätz, Gesch. x. 24, 200 et seq.;
Transaction Jew. Hist. Soc. Eng. ii. 156 et seq.;
Julius Fürst, Bibl. Jud. ii. 232 et seq.;
Meyer Kayserling, Bibl. Esp.-Port.-Jud. pp. 58 et seq.
Offenberg, Adri K., “Bibliography of the Works of Jacob Jehuda Leon (Templo), Studia Rosenthaliana, 12/XII Nos. 1-2, (July 1978), pp. 111-132.
Offenberg, Adri K., “Jacob Jehuda Leon (1602-1675) and his Model of the Temple,” in Johannes van den Berg and Ernestine G. E. vand der Wall (eds.), Jewish-Christian Relations in the Seventeenth Century: Studies and Documents, Dordrech, 1988, pp. 95–115.

External links
 Encyclopaedia Judaica (2007) entry on "Templo, Jacob Judah (Aryeh) Leon" by Cecil Roth, and A.K. Offenberg (2nd ed).
 Leon Templo – Rabbi Jacob Judah Leon: Masonic Papers by Leon Zeldis

1603 births
17th-century deaths
17th-century Sephardi Jews
17th-century German rabbis
Dutch Sephardi Jews
Sephardi rabbis
Writers from Hamburg